Jack Cole may refer to:

 Jack Cole (artist) (1914–1958), American comic book artist and cartoonist
 Jack Cole (businessman) (1920–2007), American entrepreneur and businessman
 Jack Cole (choreographer) (1911–1974), American dancer, choreographer and theatre director
 Jack Cole (scientist), professor at the School of Computer Science, University of St. Andrews, Scotland
 Jack A. Cole (born 1938), retired detective and executive director of Law Enforcement Action Partnership
 Jack Isadore Cole (1920–1997), co-founder of the Coles bookstore chain and Coles Notes
 Jack Cole, pseudonym of David Donachie (born 1944), Scottish nautical historical novelist
 Jack Cole (rugby league), Australian rugby player

See also
 Jack Coles (disambiguation)
 John Cole (disambiguation)